Shalateen (also spelled Shalatin and Shalatayn) is the biggest town in the Halaib Triangle, a disputed territory claimed  by both Egypt and the Sudan.

 Abu Ramad,  to the southeast;
 Halaib,  to the southeast;
 Ras Hadarba  to the southeast. Ras Hadarba or Cape Hadarba lies on the shores of the Red Sea to the southeast of the city of Halayib and to the east of mount Hadarba from which it takes its name. The village of Ras Hadarba lies just north of the borders between Egypt and the Sudan which run along the 22 degree north parallel of latitude;
 Marsa Hameera,  to the north; and
 Abrak,  to the west.

The first three of the above towns (Abu Ramad, Halayib and Ras Hadarba) are located within the disputed Hala'ib Triangle.

History
Egyptian ministries and authorities are in the process of establishing their presence in the area and operate in conjunction with the City Council to provide services to the local communities according to the policies and programs of their respective organizations.  The military is responsible for security and law enforcement in the Halayib Triangle.  Red Sea Governorate's Popular Council, including many members from the Bishari tribe and the Ababda people, are responsible for determining what the local people need and supporting local participation in management and development of this area.

The Egyptian government also provides additional social services to the local communities, such as food, water, monetary assistance, subsidies, health care, veterinary care, housing and education.

Climate
Köppen-Geiger climate classification system classifies its climate as a hot desert (BWh).

Ethnography

Local tribes in Halayib and Shalateen area have had little exposure to modernization under Sudanese administration and under Egyptian administration up to 1992. But after 1992, the Egyptian government started to implement a development plan when it started to build some settlements, including 500 new houses built in Shalateen and 250 in Aboramad and Halayib, depending on Shalateen local council sources. Roads were also established, including a 250-kilometer road between Shalateen and Marsa Alam city in north, and three new electricity generators have begun operation since 1993. In 1993–94, the Egyptian government launched a plan for the social economic development of the area. Services and economic support were delivered in the main towns and villages and necessary infrastructures was built. Financial and in-kind donations were sponsored for a total amount of 1.5 billion L.E. currently; the government is supporting local families with 70 L.E. per month, and 3 L.E. per day to each child going to school. Nowadays many highly educated people, and many local people, work as employees of the government, NGOs and private sector companies.

Depending on that and on the government development policy, many people from the mountains moved to towns in order to benefit from these services. They were given houses with a permanent water source, food supplies, electricity and education. So far, approximately 8,000 people have settled along the coast. As a result of the plan, communities in the urban areas have improved their livelihood.

The local community in Halayib area has been involved in the management of Gabal Elba Protected Area as guides and also as environmental researchers in the management and conservation of the natural resources of this area; local people are also involved in the decision-making process.  The World Food Program project in this area "Support Bedouin Life Project" represents a good model for the Egyptian government's policy of local participation and community-based management of projects.

The languages spoken there varies on local Beja, Arabic and English languages.

References

Notes

Sources 
 Metrash,A.& Pozzan, E (2002). Preliminary Study of the Local Communities in Elba Protected Area,Report submitted for EIECP,EGYPTIAN ITALIAN ENVIRONMENTAL COOPERATION PROGRAM - PHASE II EEAA,Egypt
 World Food Program (2005),report about WFP projects in Egypt, also available via http://www.wfp.org/operations/current_operations/project_docs/104500.pdf

External links
 

Populated places in Red Sea Governorate